The R713 is a Regional Route in South Africa.

Route
Its north-western terminus is the R30, 25 km from Bothaville and 35 km from Odendaalsrus. It runs east-south-east, to end at a junction with the R34, 15 km from Kroonstad and 30 km from Odendaalsrus.

References 

Regional Routes in the Free State (province)